William Taylor (October 12, 1791 – September 16, 1865) was an American physician and politician who served three terms as a U.S. Representative from New York from 1833 to 1839.

Biography
Born in Suffield, Connecticut, Taylor moved with his parents to Onondaga County, New York.
He attended the public schools.

He studied medicine and was admitted to practice.

Congress 
Taylor was elected as a Jacksonian to the Twenty-third and Twenty-fourth Congresses and reelected as a Democrat to the Twenty-fifth Congress (March 4, 1833 – March 3, 1839).
He served as chairman of the Committee on Invalid Pensions (Twenty-fifth Congress).

Later career 
He resumed the practice of his chosen profession.
He served as member of the state assembly in 1841 and 1842.
He served as delegate to the state constitutional convention in 1846.

Death and burial 
He died in Manlius, New York, September 16, 1865. He was interred in Christ Church Cemetery.

Sources

1791 births
1865 deaths
Jacksonian members of the United States House of Representatives from New York (state)
19th-century American politicians
Democratic Party members of the United States House of Representatives from New York (state)